"Don't Underestimate My Love for You" is a song written by Dave Loggins, Steve Dorff and Steve Diamond, and recorded by American country music artist Lee Greenwood.  It was released in November 1985 as the second single from the album Streamline.  Greenwood's fifth number one country single in the United States, it spent one week at the top of the Billboard country chart in March 1986 and twelve weeks on the chart overall.

Chart performance

References

1986 singles
Lee Greenwood songs
Songs written by Steve Diamond (songwriter)
Songs written by Steve Dorff
Songs written by Dave Loggins
MCA Records singles
Song recordings produced by Jerry Crutchfield
1985 songs